Tolichaka is a village of Pipalkot VDC Dailekh District western Nepal. Tolichaka is the main village of Pipalkot VDC. There are 940 people live in Tolichaka.

See also
Palkot
Dailekh District

References

Populated places in Dailekh District